Hưng Khánh Trung A is a commune (xã) of Mỏ Cày Bắc District, Bến Tre Province, Vietnam. The commune covers an area of 13.32 km². In 1999 it had a population of 8,760.

References

 

 

Communes of Bến Tre province
Populated places in Bến Tre province